Bihar Diaries: The True Story of How Bihar's Most Dangerous Criminal Was Caught is a non-fiction crime book written by Indian Police officer, Amit Lodha in 2018.

In November 2022, Netflix released the webseries Khakee: The Bihar Chapter inspired by this book.

Plot 
The story starts from the criminal birth of Samant Pratap (renamed), a sharpshooter of Ashok Mahto gang, earlier named as Vijay Samrat but later it was removed because Vijay Samrat is the name of a local Rashtriya Janata Dal politician.

References 

2018 books
Penguin Books books